The Sadeler family were the largest, and probably the most successful of the dynasties of Flemish engravers that were dominant in Northern European printmaking in the later 16th and 17th centuries, as both artists and publishers.  As with other dynasties such as the Wierixes and Van de Passe family, the style of family members is very similar, and their work often hard to tell apart in the absence of a signature or date, or evidence of location. Altogether at least ten Sadelers worked as engravers, in the Spanish Netherlands, Germany, Italy, Bohemia and Austria.

Much of their best work was high quality reproductive prints of contemporary artists such as Bartholomeus Spranger (Aegidius II) or the Venetian Bassano family (Jan I and Rafael I), that were important in spreading the reputation and style of these artists.

The family
The Sadelers were descended from "chasers,"  engravers of armour, from Aalst.  Jan de Saeyelleer or Sadeleer had three sons, all usually called "Sadeler": Jan I (1550 Brussels - 1600 Brussels or possibly Venice), Aegidius I (c. 1555 Brussels - c. 1609 Frankfurt am Main) and Rafael I (1560/61 Antwerp - 1628 or 1632).  Another Sadeler, Marcus or Marco, was a printer and perhaps publisher who was working in Haarlem in c. 1586-87, and is presumed to be a member of the family, though it is not known where he fits in.

Jan I was the father of Justus (ca. 1572 Antwerp - c. 1620) and Marcus Christoph (b. Munich, active 1614 to after 1650).  Aegidius I was the father of Aegidius II (c. 1570 Antwerp - 1629 Prague). Rafael I was the father of Rafael II (1584 - 1627 or 1632, both Antwerp), Jan II (c. 1588 - 1665 or later) and Filips (c. 1600, active to 1650).  
Aegidius II was the father of Tobias, who was active from 1670-75 in Vienna.

Jan Sadeler I and Rafael I
Jan was in Antwerp by 1572; it was then the centre of the printmaking world, with hugely productive workshops producing work for publishers with excellent distribution arrangements throughout Europe.  In that year he became a master of the artists' Guild of Saint Luke, and married in Antwerp Cathedral.  By 1569 or 1570 he was doing work for the publisher Christopher Plantin.  His younger brother Rafael I joined him there, and they continued to work closely together, moving to Cologne in about 1579, but continuing to visit Antwerp.  The disruptions of the Dutch Revolt scattered all the Antwerp artists across Northern Europe, and after the siege of Antwerp in 1585 Jan and Rafael worked in several German cities - Mainz, Frankfurt-am-main, Munich without settling for long, before they went to Italy in 1593, where Jan may have died. They first went, accompanied by their nephew Aegidius II, to Verona, then Venice from 1596/7, where they had a shop.  In 1604 Rafael returned to Munich, where he remained for most of the rest of his life, of which the last record comes in 1622. Jan's son Marcus, or Marco, remained in Italy as a publisher and artist, though there may be confusion between his work and that of his presumed relation the older Marcus.

Three of their best-known prints after the Bassani are known as the "Sadeler kitchen scenes".  They show respectively Christ in the house of Mary and Martha, at Emmaus, and Dives and Lazarus.

Aegidius Sadeler II
Aegidius Sadeler (sometimes written Egidius, or Gilles) was also a painter, and a leading Northern Mannerist engraver; the best of the dynasty.  After moving to Cologne in childhood (c. 1579), then Munich (c. 1588), he trained in Antwerp, and went to Italy, working in Rome (1593), then back to Munich with his uncles Jan and Rafael in 1594, travelling with them to Verona, and probably Venice (1595–97).  After a trip (apparently alone) to Naples he moved to Prague in 1597, where spent the rest of his life, mostly employed by Emperor Rudolf II.  He lived for some time in the house of Bartholomeus Spranger, whose works he engraved.  As the more important figure, references to just Aegidius Sadeler are more likely to mean him than his father.

He sold prints from a stall in the Vladislav Hall in Prague Castle, shown in a well-known engraving of his (1607), and his prints after Spranger, Roelant Savery and other Prague artists were important in disseminating the style of Rudolfine Mannerism across Europe, especially Germany and the Netherlands.  He also painted, although no works certainly by him survive.

His early works were mostly religious prints after Northern painters, several in sets.  In Italy he added Northern painters working in Italy, such as Paul Bril and Denys Calvaert, as well as Italian masters both some generations older (Titian, Raphael, Parmigianino, and contemporary (Tintoretto, Barocci).  In Prague he engraved the Mannerists of Rudolf's court, but also did many portraits of notables, and engraved many of the Dürer drawings in the Imperial collection.  He collaborated with Jacobus Typotius on the Prague emblem book, Symbola Divina et Humana.

Gallery

Notes

References

Bowen, Karen L. and Imhof, Dirk. Christopher Plantin and Engraved Book Illustrations in Sixteenth-Century Europe, Cambridge University Press, 2008, . Google books - short biographies, with long lists of works for Plantin, and mentions passim.
Bury, Michael; The Print in Italy, 1550-1620, 2001, British Museum Press, 
Hind Arthur M.; A History of Engraving and Etching, Houghton Mifflin Co. 1923 (in USA), reprinted Dover Publications, 1963 
Getty Foundation, Union List of Artists' Names online
Grove Art Online, the various articles on the family & its members. Accessed 13 July 2009
Mayor, Hyatt A., Prints and People, Metropolitan Museum of Art/Princeton, 1971,

External links

British Museum online database has 805 items by or after the family

Artists from Antwerp
Flemish engravers
Renaissance engravers
Artist families